Nightexpress Luftverkehrsgesellschaft mbH was a small German cargo airline based at Frankfurt Airport. In 2013, the company was bought by BDA (Bespoke Distribution Aviation). The company ceased operations in late 2017.

Destinations
Nightexpress operated scheduled and chartered cargo flights from Frankfurt Airport, most of which were either to Birmingham Airport or Coventry Airport.

Fleet

As of December 2015, the Nightexpress fleet consisted of the following aircraft:

Accidents and incidents

 On 30 June 1999 at 02:41 UTC, Nightexpress Flight 114, a Beechcraft Model 99 (registered D-IBEX) crashed near Liège Airport, Belgium, killing the two pilots on board. The aircraft had left London Luton Airport at 01:25 UTC for a cargo flight to Frankfurt Airport, when the pilots reported failures in both engines at 02:34 UTC. The aircraft was cleared to perform an emergency landing at either Brussels Airport or Liège Airport, but ultimately crashed 5 nautical miles short of the latter's runway.

References

External links 

 

Defunct airlines of Germany
Airlines established in 1984
Airlines disestablished in 2017
1984 establishments in West Germany